The Martin J. Broussard Center for Athletic Training is the athletic training and rehabilitation center for LSU athletics at Louisiana State University. The two-story, 22,000 square foot facility, built in 1998, serves as the main athletic training facility for all treatments and rehabilitations. The facility is located adjacent to Tiger Stadium and is staffed by full-time certified staff athletic trainers, certified graduate assistants and athletic training students.

First Floor
The first floor contains treatment tables, taping stations and a 1,600 sq. foot rehabilitation area that offers rehabilitation equipment for the athletes. The area also includes computers/work stations that track an athlete's injury and generates exercise and rehabilitation protocols.

Rehabilitation area
The rehabilitation area is used for both short and long-term therapy. The equipment includes cardiovascular equipment, equipment to build, rebuild and maintain strength along with rehabilitating joints and diagnostic tools to determine the strengths and deficits of the athletes.

Pool Rehabilitation AreaThe 2,400 square foot pool rehabilitation area includes Jacuzzi style walk-in whirlpools, a lap pool that varies in depth and a pool for cardiovascular training. Another area also has a walk-in cold jacuzzi style tub.

Second Floor
The second level offers physician offices, an x-ray room with a casting room, an echocardiogram (EKG) station, a full-service dental clinic, an optometry center and pharmacy.

This level also houses an athletic training student lounge and a conference room and meeting room for athletic training students. The John Weston Hawie Family Conference Room is used for meetings, student in-services and interviews and the Dr. Joe Serio Library located in the conference room stores books and periodicals pertaining to athletic training. The second floor also contains a storage room that contains all of the medical supplies that the athletic training department would use including splints, braces and first aid supplies.

Satellite Athletic Training facilities
Alex Box Stadium, Skip Bertman Field athletic training facility
Carl Maddox Field House athletic training facility
LSU Football Operations Center athletic training facility 
LSU Gymnastics Training Facility athletic training facility
LSU Soccer Complex athletic training facility
LSU Tennis Complex athletic training facility
Pete Maravich Assembly Center Main and Men's Basketball athletic training facility 
Tiger Park athletic training facility
Sources:

Gallery

See also
LSU Tigers and Lady Tigers

References

External links
LSU athletic training website

LSU Tigers and Lady Tigers
LSU Tigers baseball venues
LSU Tigers basketball venues
LSU Lady Tigers basketball venues
LSU Tigers women's beach volleyball venues
LSU Tigers and Lady Tigers cross country courses
LSU Tigers football venues
LSU Tigers golf clubs and courses
LSU Lady Tigers golf clubs and courses
LSU Tigers women's gymnastics venues
LSU Tigers women's soccer venues
LSU Tigers softball venues
LSU Tigers and Lady Tigers swimming and diving venues
LSU Tigers tennis venues
LSU Lady Tigers tennis venues
LSU Tigers and Lady Tigers track and field venues
LSU Tigers women's volleyball venues
1998 establishments in Louisiana